The Knights of Pythias Building and Theatre, also known as K. of P. Building, is a historic building located at Greensburg, Decatur County, Indiana. It was built in 1899 by the Knights of Pythias, and is a three-story brick building that includes Early Commercial and Italianate style design elements.  A four-story theater was added to the original building in 1908.  The theater closed in 1958.

It was added to the National Register of Historic Places in 1978.

References

External links

Clubhouses on the National Register of Historic Places in Indiana
Knights of Pythias buildings
Italianate architecture in Indiana
Buildings and structures completed in 1899
Buildings designated early commercial in the National Register of Historic Places
Buildings and structures in Decatur County, Indiana
National Register of Historic Places in Decatur County, Indiana
Historic district contributing properties in Indiana